= Francis Barry Boyle St Leger =

British novelist

- Born: 16 September 1799; Ireland
- Died: 20 November 1829 (aged 30)
- Occupation: Novelist

Francis Barry Boyle St Leger (16 September 1799 – 20 November 1829) was a British novelist.

== Biography ==
St Leger was born in Ireland on 16 September 1799. He was the second eldest son of Richard St. Leger (second son of the first Viscount Doneraile) by his wife Anne, daughter of Charles Blakeney of Holywell, Roscommon. After being educated at Rugby he is said to have obtained in 1816 a civil appointment in the East India Company's service. He resigned his post about 1821 and returned to England, where he edited from 1822 onward the fashionable annual called ‘The Album.’ He printed in 1821, for private circulation, a volume of poems—‘Remorse and other Poems’—and in 1824 appeared his best-known work, ‘Some Account of the Life of the late Gilbert Earle, Esq.’ (anon. 12mo, London). In 1826 he was editor of ‘The Brazen Head,’ and in the same year published (anonymously) another novel, entitled ‘Mr. Blount's MSS., being selections from the papers of a Man of the World’ (12mo, London). In 1829 he published ‘Tales of Passion.’ He died unmarried, after an epileptic seizure, on 20 November 1829. A posthumous work, ‘Froissart and his Times,’ appeared in 1832 (3 vols. 8vo, London).
